The Central District of Bandar-e Anzali County is a district (bakhsh) in Bandar-e Anzali County, Gilan Province, Iran. At the 2006 census, its population was 130,851, in 38,810 families.  The District has one city: Bandar-e Anzali. The District has two rural districts (dehestan): Chahar Farizeh Rural District and Licharegi-ye Hasan Rud Rural District.

References 

Bandar-e Anzali County
Districts of Gilan Province